These are the full results of the 2016 South American Under-23 Championships in Athletics which took place between September 23 and 25 at Villa Deportiva Nacional in Lima, Peru.

Men's results

100 meters

Heats – September 23Wind:Heat 1: -2.1 m/s, Heat 2: -2.2 m/s

Final – September 24Wind:+1.4 m/s

200 meters

Heats – September 24Wind:Heat 1: -1.3 m/s, Heat 2: -1.5 m/s

Final – September 25Wind:0.0 m/s

400 meters
September 24

800 meters
September 24

1500 meters
September 23

5000 meters
September 25

10,000 meters
September 23

110 meters hurdles
September 24Wind: +0.4 m/s

400 meters hurdles
September 25

3000 meters steeplechase
September 24

4 × 100 meters relay
September 24

4 × 400 meters relay
September 25

20,000 meters walk
September 24

High jump
September 24

Pole vault
September 25

Long jump
September 24

Triple jump
September 23

Shot put
September 24

Discus throw
September 25

Hammer throw
September 24

Javelin throw
September 23

Decathlon
September 23–24

Women's results

100 meters
September 24Wind: 0.0 m/s

200 meters
September 25Wind: 0.0 m/s

400 meters
September 24

800 meters
September 24

1500 meters
September 23

5000 meters
September 25

10,000 meters
September 23

100 meters hurdles
September 24Wind: +0.0 m/s

400 meters hurdles
September 25

3000 meters steeplechase
September 24

4 × 100 meters relay
September 24

4 × 400 meters relay
September 25

20,000 meters walk
September 25

High jump
September 24

Pole vault
September 24

Long jump
September 24

Triple jump
September 23

Shot put
September 24

Discus throw
September 25

Hammer throw
September 24

Javelin throw
September 23

Heptathlon
September 24–25

References

Results
Day 1 evening results
Day 2 morning results
Day 2 evening results
Day 3 morning results

South American Under-23 Championships in Athletics
Events at the South American Under-23 Championships in Athletics